Eshgaft-e Mona (also Romanized as Eshgaft-e Monā) is a village in Jastun Shah Rural District, Hati District, Lali County, Khuzestan Province, Iran. At the 2006 census, its population was 44, in 9 families.

References 

Populated places in Lali County